This is a list of the complete squads for the 2011 Six Nations Championship, an annual rugby union tournament contested by the national rugby teams of England, France, Ireland, Italy, Scotland and Wales. Each country is entitled to name a squad of 39 players to contest the championship. They may also invite additional players along prior to the start of the championship, while the coach can call up replacement players if squad members suffer serious injury.

NB
 Ages are given as of 4 February 2011, the opening day of the tournament.
 All cap totals are as of the start of the tournament, and do not include appearances made during the competition.

England
Martin Johnson announced a 33-man England squad for the 2011 Six Nations on 11 January.

Since the squad announcement, four players originally named have been ruled out for at least part of the Six Nations:
 Captain Lewis Moody suffered a knee injury that was initially believed to rule him out for the first three rounds of the competition. Moody has since stated that his recovery is progressing well enough that he hopes to play in England's third match against France on 26 February.
 Delon Armitage was banned for eight weeks by the Rugby Football Union after a physical confrontation with an anti-doping official on 1 January. His suspension ends on 16 March, three days before England's final match against Ireland.
 Two other players named to the squad, Tom Croft and Courtney Lawes, were injured, but Johnson apparently hoped they would be fit for the Six Nations. However, both have since been ruled out for at least the first month of the competition. Dave Attwood, who had been a strong contender for a place in the squad, was also unavailable, in his case due to a suspension.
As a result of these injuries and suspensions, England called up four players as replacements on 24 January—lock George Skivington, loose forwards Phil Dowson and Tom Wood, and fullback Nick Abendanon. The call-up of two loose forwards also reflected a knee injury suffered by Hendre Fourie the previous weekend that was being evaluated by England's medical staff.
 Alex Corbisiero and James Simpson-Daniel were called up to cover for injuries to Payne and Abendanon.
 Chris Robshaw was called up to the training squad to cover for Joe Worsley.

Head coach:  Martin Johnson

France
Marc Lièvremont announced a 30-man France squad for the 2011 Six Nations on 19 January.

Head coach:  Marc Lièvremont

Ireland
Ireland named their squad for the 2011 Six Nations Championship on 19 January.
 Flannery, Hayes, Ferris, Heaslip, Bowe, Horgan and Trimble were ruled out of the first game at least. While McCarthy and Stringer were dropped. McLaughlin, O'Leary and McFadden were called up in their place.
 Wilkinson, Ryan, Spence, Hurley and J.Murphy were all called up ahead of the clash against France.
 Buckley was called up along with several other players ahead of the match against Scotland.
 Toner was called up along with other players ahead of the Wales match.

Head coach:  Declan Kidney

Italy
Nick Mallett announced a preliminary 24-man squad on 17 January for Italy's first two matches against Ireland and England. Bernabò, Sole and M.Pratichetti were called up to the squad to cover for injuries. Gori suffered a dislocated shoulder in the opening game and is likely to miss the whole tournament. Fabio Semenzato replaced him. Carlo Festuccia was called up the squad before the game against England to cover for injuries. Lorenzo Cittadini was called in the squad, replacing Rouyet, ahead of the game against Wales. Vosawai and Tebaldi were also called up to cover for injuries.

Head coach:  Nick Mallett

Scotland
Andy Robinson named his squad for the Six Nations on 19 January. Alasdair Strokosch was called up to the squad after his return to full fitness.

Head coach:  Andy Robinson

Wales
Wales' 28-man squad for the 2011 Six Nations Championship was announced on 23 January.

Back-rower Taulupe Faletau, initially named to the squad, suffered an ankle injury on the day the squad was announced and was ruled out for a minimum of six weeks; his earliest possible return to the squad would be in Wales' fourth match against Ireland on 12 March. Faletau was replaced by Rob McCusker. Halfpenny was ruled out of the first game against England, his place in the squad was taken by Prydie. Chris Czekaj was called up to cover Stoddart's injury. After injury concerns to Matthew Rees, Huw Bennett joined the squad.

Head coach:  Warren Gatland

References

External links
 RBS Six Nations Squad Index

2011
2011 Six Nations Championship